Tribeni is a locality in Bansberia Municipality of Hooghly district in the Indian state of West Bengal and is currently a part of the area covered by  (KMDA). It is an old holy place for the Hindus, the sanctity of which has been recognized for many centuries and had been mentioned in Pavanaduta, a Sanskrit piece of the last quarter of the 12th century. The Muslims took it over during early phases of their conquest of Bengal, also referred to as Turkish conquest in the thirteenth century. The place retains its holiness for multiple centuries, primarily due to the rivers it hosted, corroborated by records of the bathers at different timelines, who thronged during the festival of Makar Sankranti. Of the many odes written on the Ganges in various Indian languages, one that was recited and entered as a ritual offering to the river by the Brahmins during the medieval period, was presumably written in Sanskrit by Gaji Jafar Khan during his stay in Tribeni.

Geography

Location

History 

Tribeni is believed to get its name from the divergence of three rivers — Kunti, Ganga and Saraswati. The probable earlier names were "Muktaveni", which distinguished it from Prayag, Allahabad, known as Yuktaveni; it also featured in James Rennell's map of Bengal in 1781 where it was spelled as "Terbonee". The river Saraswati surfaces from the south of the famous Hindu cremate area, commonly known as ‘Shashan ghat’, westwards into Saptagram. The Yamuna, commonly pronounced as Jamuna in Bengali, had earlier branched off from the Ganges towards south east, but the confluence has silted up with course of time. This leaves the river Ganges, variedly known as Hooghly or Bhagirathi to descend to the sea. The Ghat in Tribeni which lies beside the confluence was built by a king of Bhurisrestha, Rudranarayan Rai Mukhti and that left an influence of Odisha in Tribeni apparent from the temples near the ghat.
The town is on the western banks of the Ganges with no plateau or hills in its close vicinity and hosts one of the earliest surviving monuments of Muslim in West Bengal, Zafar Khan Gazi's Mosque. The mosque bears an Arabic chronogram, 1298 though there remains evidence that suggests it was remodeled over time. The date is further corroborated by the fact that Tribeni along with nearby areas were occupied by Zafar Khan in 1267, after around 60 years from the conquest of Bengal. Its doorways have Hindu Vaishnavite sculptures inscribed along with Sanskrit scripts on its walls which can be associated to a temple from where the slabs were procured or as well could be a temple on which the mosque probably was built.

Tribeni had been of great importance during the Pala and Sena periods, and after the Muslim incursions, Saptagram became a major administrative center for the Sultans of Bengal. During the sixteenth century, Portuguese and French settlements in the Hooghly District were presumably looking to the possibility of trade across the Saraswati River at the port of Saptagram. Around 1536–37, the King of Bengal had given the Custom houses in Satgaon, today's Saptagram, along with Chittagong, the major port, to the Portuguese to set up trading centers, which ultimately extended their land occupation. During 1579–80, Antonio Tavares founded Ugolim (Hooghly) which outshone Satgaon, and had around five thousand Portuguese inhabitants. Their settlement was highly curtailed during the Mughal assault, where they appeared relatively ill-equipped for such an attack. For the same vulnerability of Mughal threats and the lack of available defense along with depleting trade prospects through Saraswati due to its drying up, Job Charnock, chief agent of East India Company in Hugli, along with his team decided to move further south to Sutanuti in 1690, where several local villages were populated by local merchants and a trading center was available, which later became part of Calcutta. Tribeni was also a host to the British army during WWII in Nissen huts which can still be seen near Shibpur. Though these didn't have much enduring socio-economic impact, as they did at Bandel and Chandernagore, the town was however revived by many factories in the 20th century, e.g. jute mills, the Bandel Thermal Power Station, the paper factory for ITC and the tire and rayon factories nearby the town.

Tribeni thus differentiated itself from its neighbors, who were relying more on agriculture due to the available fertile land, as an industrial belt. There is no absolute evidence of an old trading center or market place, though with the advent of industries newer market places came into existence.  Post independence, the town has witnessed many economic ups and downs due to the economic changes in the industries it houses. The downfall of Jute mills across the Ganges post Partition of India, which had flourished during the late 19th century and once unseated Scotland Jute mills at Dundee, preceded the economic drain from West Bengal and the Ganges Jute Mill at Tribeni was no exception. The annual demand for Indian Jute mills of 6 million raw Jute bales during 1947-48 mostly lay unfulfilled, due to 80% of the cultivable lands for Jute falling in East Pakistan now Bangladesh, and could only meet 1.7 million bales during that period. The following three five year plans by the Government of India helped increase the production but by then the foreign demand for Indian jute started to drop, which led the jute mills to limit production, if not stop it completely. There could be few reasons attributed to such a downfall, viz., the monopolistic structure and control of the industry and methods applied to increase profitability by restricting production so as to reduce the demand and price of raw jute, the paucity of funds post independence and lack of research and development, the cheaper alternatives available and sluggish Indian market to Jute products. There was similar fortune awaiting for Dunlop tire factory in Sahaganj as well by the end of 20th century, irrespective of once having monopoly in Aero tire production.

The density of population, in the 21st century, is on a rise, and as such the communication has seen a growth, both in railways as well as in postal services among others; Internet and cell phone connectivity have entered Tribeni in the late 20th century, parallel to other towns in Hooghly.

Transport & tourism
Tribeni is 66 km away from Kolkata, capital of West Bengal, on road and 48 km from Howrah Station (Railway station adjoined to Kolkata) in Broad Gauge railways,  which can be covered in EMU coaches (Electric Multiple Units). Tribeni railway station was renovated in 2010 to have four platforms from existing two, but it doesn't host any express or super fast trains and usually finds them passing through it towards New Jalpaiguri towards north. The nearest major railway station is Bandel Junction, 7 km on the Bandel-Katwa Railway Line, which can be used to board express trains towards north Bengal as well as towards New Delhi. The town is also benefitted by the Howrah-Bardhaman main line. Mogra railway station can be commuted from Tribeni with ease, whereas Kalyani railway station is situated on the other side of the Bhagirathi-Hooghly River and one can reach Kolkata via Sealdah using the Sealdah-Krishnanagar Railways, from there.

A 1922 built 103 ton steam engine by W.M. Breadmore Co, England had a run with five coaches from Howrah to Tribeni Railway station on 19 September 1999. This was widely known as Millennium Run and was also likely to be retained to promote tourism but was discontinued due to lack of response.

State Highway 6/ STKK Road runs through the town and meets the Grand Trunk Road, one of the Asia's oldest and longest major road and also runs besides the town, near Adisaptagram. Buses for route numbered  39 between Chunchura Court & Jirat, the farthest that can be traveled between south and north in a single bus journey, runs through the State Highway. Tribeni can also be travelled in tri-cycle rickshaws, commonly found in eastern India, though the cheapest available are shared autos and battery operated rickshaws, which might remain overcrowded and may not be practicable for carrying luggage along. The shared autos are a common sight across the town and are very often frequented by the residents to commute even 10 km on a single ride, irrespective of the concerns attached therein.

National Waterway 1, stretching for 1620 km from Haldia to Allahabad, has an ambitious plan of cargo movement and be operative by 2021 through the Bhagirathi-Hooghly River adjacent to the town. The depth of the river from Kolkata to Tribeni was verified to be able to navigate an inland vessel of loaded draft for 4 meters, and can form a part of river information system abbreviated as RIS which would help vessels to navigate by avoiding ship to ship collision, ship to bridge collision and grounding.

Jafar Khan Gazi's Mosque resembles a unique transformation from stone post and lintel temples belonging to Pala senas to brick dome and arch structures, quite common to Muslim rulers in West Bengal.

Hangseshwari Temple, in Bansberia, is 21 meters tall and has 13 towers, each shaped as a lotus flower, is a marvellous feat of architecture based on Kundalini and yoga concepts. Inner precincts of the  follow the design of the human anatomy. Metallic idol of rising Sun God with his thousand bright rays has been inscribed on the top of the central minar. Even the deity has been designed and installed following the concept of Yoga and Pranayam. The Deity is blue in colour and made of wood derived from "Neem" tree. 

The temple complex has another temple Ananta Basudeba Temple besides the main temple, which holds a very special position as a terracotta temple with exquisite terracotta works on it. 

Bandel Church, situated around 7 km from Tribeni, is the oldest church in West Bengal, initially constructed by 1599, was reconstructed post the Portuguese settlement were savaged and later awarded back by the Mughal Emperor. The statue ‘Our Lady of the Happy Voyage’ was saved from the attack and was miraculously found later and reinstated. The name of the place supposedly came from the Portuguese word ‘Mastro de Bandeira’ which meant flag post and later got transformed to Bandel, as the captain of a wrecked ship offered the main mast he promised to offer the first church he would find. The ship with its crew, is believed to arrive at its bank when the celebrations for the inauguration of the church were on its way.

Among other interesting facts in and around Tribeni are 1. There was a large European settlement south of Tribeni, which included Portuguese, Dutch, French & Danish settlements even before British East India Company made Calcutta their stronghold. 2. "Barowari puja" or public organisation of a religious festival, which was a sharp contrast to the way big festivals were conducted by rich families, commenced in Guptipara, north of Tribeni. 3. Jubilee Bridge (now replaced by Sampreeti Bridge) connecting Bandel and Naihati is one of the oldest rail bridges in the country, was constructed even before the Howrah Bridge. 4. Kalyani, situated on the eastern side of the Ganges, was a site for American Airbase during WWII and was later developed as a planned town post independence to accommodate growing housing demand in Calcutta.

Sports and Activities
Popular sports are Football and Cricket, which are more often played among boys. There are few tournaments that happen annually, as well as many ad-hoc tournaments are organized, mostly with altered rules from the common formats, wherein many clubs and schools compete. Other commonly played games are badminton, tipcat (‘dangulli’ in Bengali) etc., along with few board games that are also quite common: carom, chess and cards can be seen played even on road sides.

The local government usually supports other lesser popular folk team-sports e.g., kabaddi  and Kho-Kho, along with the majority of schools in the town who promotes athletics.

Kite flying can be observed more prominently in September, during the Viswakarma Puja along with the rest of West Bengal. Though it still did not advance as a sport as it did in the western countries, yet it remains quite popular in Tribeni.

Scholars
Pundit Jagannath Tarka Panchanan, the legendary scholar on all branches of the Dharmasastras was born in Tribeni on 23 September 1695, had assisted Sir William Jones (philologist) in his endeavor to compile Vivadabhangarnava –that literally means ‘a break wave on the ocean of disputes' and reconcile the schools of Hindu jurisprudence, to assist judges to familiarize with the Indian culture as a consequence of a parliamentary mandate to perform judicial duties. The text was first published under the title – A Digest of Hindu Law, in 1801, which tried to legitimize the transformation of the prescriptive guidelines enshrined in the Sastras into legal rules to be directly administered through court by using terminologies like 'Digest'. He supposedly introduced Durga Puja in Tribeni, and the Baikunthupur Durga puja  continues its traditions even today.

Ramgopal Ghosh, born in Bagati in the year 1815, was a member of the first council of Bethune Society, a literary association established in Calcutta in December 1851 for the consideration and discussion of questions connected with literature and science with the object of promoting the spirit of inquiry and knowledge among the Bengalis on the one hand, and establishing racial harmony between the Europeans and the natives on the other.

Sarat Chandra Chattopadhyay was a popular Bengali novelist and short story writer of the early 20th century, was born in Debanandapur, near Bandel.

See also 
 Triveni Sangam

References

External links 
 
 
 Zafar Khan Ghazi Mosque at Tribeni

Cities and towns in Hooghly district
Neighbourhoods in Kolkata
Kolkata Metropolitan Area